Rahmatabad (also Romanized as Raḩmatābād) is a village in Golshan Rural District, in the Central District of Tabas County, South Khorasan Province, Iran. At the 2006 census, its population was 27, in 9 families.

References 

Populated places in Tabas County